Phyllocosmus is a genus of small trees in the family Ixonanthaceae native to tropical Africa. It is closely related to the South American genus Ochthocosmus and was once considered to be a part of it.

References

Ixonanthaceae
Malpighiales genera